Plusiodonta coelonota, the snake vine moth, is a moth of the family Erebidae. The species was first described by Vincenz Kollar in 1844. It is found from India, Sri Lanka, Myanmar, Andaman Islands, Australia, Papua New Guinea, to South and South-East Asia.

Description
The wingspan is about 25–36 mm. Male with minutely ciliated antennae. Head and collar rufous. Thorax and abdomen greyish brown. Forewings reddish brown suffused with golden bronze and more or less irrorated with bluish grey scales. Indistinct antemedial and medial waved line can be seen. An oblique double sinuous postmedial line angled below the costa. Orbicular and reniform indistinct. There is a very irregularly sinuous sub-marginal golden band with dark edges, which interrupted at vein 3. Hindwings dark fuscous. Cilia pale. Larva purplish black with grey specks and streaks. Somites 7 and 11 with pinkish patches. Head reddish.

The larvae feed on Stephania japonica and Smilax australis plants.

References

External links
 
 Picture on Flickr

Calpinae
Moths described in 1844
Moths of Asia
Moths of Japan